is a live album by country singer Johnny Cash released on Columbia Records in 1973, making it his 43rd overall release. The album features Cash's concert at the Österåker Prison in Sweden held on October 3, 1972. Its counterparts in concept are the more notable At Folsom Prison (1968), At San Quentin (1969), and A Concert Behind Prison Walls (1976). Unlike aforementioned, På Österåker does not contain any of Cash's most well-known songs; it does, however, include a version of Kris Kristofferson's "Me and Bobby McGee". "Orleans Parish Prison" was released as a single, faring rather poorly on the charts. Cash had previously recorded "I Saw a Man" for his 1959 album, Hymns by Johnny Cash.

The majority of the songs featured in the original release would remain unique to this concert recording, though Cash would later record a studio version of "City Jail" for his 1977 album, The Last Gunfighter Ballad. Some lyrics from "City Jail" taken from the protagonist's dialogue with a policeman would later be incorporated by Cash into live performances of "Orange Blossom Special".

Track listing

Re-release
På Österåker was re-released during the latter part of 2007. The album differs significantly from the original. "Orleans Parish Prison" is a completely different performance; the original release version was, in fact, a studio recording overdubbed with applause for the original album and single release; the 2007 Legacy reissue replaces it with the original live rendition. "San Quentin" was recorded with Cash replacing San Quentin with Österåker which was greatly appreciated by the inmates and this version, which was performed twice, is included in the reissue along with two previously unreleased performances by Carl Perkins at the same concert. In addition, the extended version includes renditions of several of Cash's well-known hits that had been omitted from the original release in deference to new material.

Track listing

Personnel
 Johnny Cash – vocals, acoustic guitar
 Marshall Grant – bass
 W.S. Holland – drums
 Bob Wootton – electric guitar
 Carl Perkins – vocals, electric guitar
 Larry Butler – piano

Additional personnel (2007 reissue only)
Original Recordings Produced by: Larry Butler & Charlie Bragg
Produced for Reissue By: Al Quaglieri
Mixed and Mastered by: Bob Irwin at Sundazed Studios
Legacy A&R: Steve Berkowitz
Project Direction: Lars Hoglund & Tom Burleigh
Art Direction and Design: Ricky Tillblad & Joan Kjellberg/Zion Graphics
Photography: Don Hunstein, Sony BMG Archives
Executive Producers: John Carter Cash & Lou Robin

Charts
Singles – Billboard (United States)

References

External links
 På Österåker at Luma Electronic

1973 live albums
Johnny Cash live albums
Columbia Records live albums
Albums produced by Larry Butler (producer)
Prison music